The Caudron P.V. 200 was a small French amphibious floatplane built during the early 1930s.

Specifications (variant specified)

References

Bibliography

Amphibious aircraft
Floatplanes
P.V. 200